Will Capon (born 12 October 1999) is an English professional rugby union player who plays at hooker for Premiership Rugby club Bristol Bears.

Career
Capon started playing rugby at the age of seven at Winscombe R.F.C. and joined the Bristol Bears academy in 2014 while studying at Bristol Grammar School. In April 2018 he made his senior Bristol debut as they defeated Doncaster Knights to win the RFU Championship and secure promotion back to the top flight.

In August 2017 Capon scored a try for the England under-18 team against France. He was a member of the squad at the 2019 World Rugby Under 20 Championship and scored a try against Wales to finish in fifth place.

In June 2021 he was called up to a senior England training squad by head coach Eddie Jones.

References

External links
Bristol Bears Profile
ESPN Profile
Ultimate Rugby Profile

1999 births
Living people
Bristol Bears players
English rugby union players
People educated at Bristol Grammar School
Rugby union players from Bristol
Rugby union hookers